Almanac is a 2004 live album by the group They Might Be Giants. The album is composed of songs performed by the band over the course of their 2004 tour. It is only available on their band-operated music downloading website.

Song origins
 Tracks 1, 5, 15 and 19 recorded September 9, 2004 in Atlanta, Georgia
 Tracks 2, 17 and 18 recorded September 28, 2004 in Asheville, North Carolina
 Tracks 3 and 9 recorded August 14, 2004 in San Francisco
 Track 4 recorded September 27, 2004 in Raleigh, North Carolina
 Tracks 6, 7, 13 and 14 recorded October 1, 2004 in New York City
 Tracks 8, 11 and 16 recorded in New York City. It's unclear if they were recorded on October 1 or October 2
 Tracks 10 and 12 recorded September 22, 2004 in New Haven, Connecticut

Track listing
 "Clap Your Hands" – 1:58
 "Experimental Film" – 2:56
 "John Lee Supertaster" – 3:08
 "Particle Man" – 5:16
 "It's Kickin In" – 1:54
 "Dr. Worm" – 2:57
 "The Famous Polka" – 1:32
 "Stalk of Wheat" – 2:40
 "I Palindrome I" – 2:22
 "Wicked Little Critta" – 2:29
 "Bastard Wants to Hit Me" – 2:22
 "Drink!" – 3:04
 "Thunderbird" – 2:51
 "Violin" – 2:54
 "Damn Good Times" – 3:11
 "Fingertips" – 5:46
 "Robot Parade" – 2:53
 "Thank You for Coming..." – 1:24
 "End of the Tour" – 3:37

External links
Almanac at This Might Be a Wiki
Official band-operated download site

Self-released albums
They Might Be Giants live albums
2004 live albums
Idlewild Recordings live albums